Shota Suzuki may refer to:

, Japanese baseball player
, Japanese footballer
, Japanese footballer

See also
 Shoto Suzuki (born 1992), Japanese footballer